Homestead is a city within Miami-Dade County in the U.S. state of Florida, between Biscayne National Park to the east and Everglades National Park to the west. The population was 80,737 as of the 2020 census. Homestead is primarily a Miami suburb and a major agricultural area. It is a principal city of the Miami metropolitan area, which was home to an estimated 6,012,331 people at the 2015 census.

The city of Homestead is located near the southern terminus of the Homestead Extension of Florida's Turnpike where it ends at its junction with U.S. 1.  Homestead is immediately north and east of Florida City, and these two cities comprise the greater Homestead-Florida City area. Some of the notable unincorporated communities in the area are Redland, Leisure City, Naranja, and Princeton.

History

Homestead was incorporated in 1913 and is the second oldest city in Miami-Dade County next to the city of Miami.  The name originates from when the Florida East Coast Railway extension to Key West was being built. The rail line was passing through an area opened up for homesteading, and as the construction camp at the end of the line did not have a particular name, construction materials and supplies for the workers were consigned to "Homestead Country", shortened to "Homestead" by the engineers who mapped the area. Homestead and neighboring South Miami-Dade County communities bore the brunt of Category 5 Hurricane Andrew on August 24, 1992.

Geography

Homestead is a small-sized city. At its greatest north-south points – along SW 137th Avenue (Speedway Boulevard) – its city limits extend only  – from SW 288th Street (Biscayne Drive) at the north end to (theoretical) SW 352nd Street at the south end. At its greatest east-west points – along SW 328th Street (North Canal Drive / Lucy Street) – its city limits extend  – from (theoretical) SW 132nd Avenue at the east end to SW 192nd Avenue at the west end. U.S. 1 – known as Homestead Boulevard within the city limits – extends through a rather narrow northeast / southwest corridor of the city from SW 304th Street (Kings Highway) at the north end to SW 328th Street (Lucy Street) at the south end. It is at this point at the south end that Homestead and Florida City share a common border. (North of the north end at SW 304th Street is known as Unincorporated Miami-Dade County, but it is locally known as the community of Leisure City).

Major east-west streets within Homestead include SW 304th Street / NE & NW 15th Street (Kings Highway), SW 312th Street / NE & NW 8th Street (Campbell Drive), SW 320th Street (Mowry Drive), SW 328th Street / SE & SW 8th Street (North Canal Drive / Lucy Street), and SW 344th Street / SE 24th Street (Palm Drive).

The original Homestead Air Force Base was once located several miles to the northeast of Homestead, but due to annexation of formerly unincorporated land immediately to the east and northeast of the original city limits during the late-1990s the city and the far southwestern perimeter of the (now) Homestead Air Reserve Base share a common border for a small portion along SW 137th Avenue (Speedway Boulevard).

A noteworthy tourist attraction within Leisure City is Coral Castle, built by a jilted lover, Edward Leedskalnin, over the course of 28 years from 1923 to 1951.  The Fruit and Spice Park is also of interest.

Climate

Homestead experiences a tropical monsoon climate (Köppen climate classification Am) that borders on a tropical savanna climate (Aw). Summers are hot and humid and high temperatures average between 90° and 92 °F (32° to 33 °C). Winters are warm and dry. The all-time record high temperature is 100 °F (38 °C), on 21 July 1942. Lows in summer average between 70° and 75 °F (21° to 24 °C), with low temperatures in all times of year averaging 5 degrees cooler than coastal Miami, mainly because of its inland and rural location. In winter, the area sees cold fronts bring cold weather for short periods from November to March. The lowest temperature ever recorded is 26 °F (–3 °C), on 13 December 1934, which was recorded at Homestead Air Force Base, some 10 miles east of the town. High temperatures in winter average between 68° and 80 °F (18° to 26 °C), and lows average between 57° and 64 °F (8° to 14 °C). Summer is the season when most of the rain occurs. Homestead has a wet season lasting from mid-May to early October. The dry season sees some rain, with most of it coming with the passing of cold fronts. Snow flurries were reported to have been observed in the air at Homestead Air Force Base, on January 20, 1977, and marked the farthest south that snow flurries have ever been reported in the lower 48 United States.

Hurricanes

In August 1992, the Category 5 hurricane Andrew devastated the town, as well as nearby Homestead Air Force Base. Hurricane Katrina caused flooding in Homestead in August 2005. The following October, Hurricane Wilma damaged light poles, grandstands, garages, and sections of catch fence at the Homestead–Miami Speedway, a motor racetrack built in the years following Hurricane Andrew. After Hurricane Wilma, a Homestead man was killed in a tractor accident while clearing debris.

When Hurricane Irma struck Florida in September 2017, parts of Homestead lost electric power. South Dade Center, a low-income housing project for farmworkers, was flooded with rainwater. Residents were without electricity and waste collection for about a week without relief.

Demographics

2020 census

As of the 2020 United States census, there were 80,737 people, 20,320 households, and 15,784 families residing in the city.

Media

The city of Homestead is served by the Miami market for local radio and television. Homestead has its own newspaper, the South Dade News Leader, which has been serving the South Dade community since 1913. The News Leader is published on Fridays.

"Inside Homestead TV" is a television program where viewers can find out about all the happenings in Homestead. Each month, a news show is released offering Homestead residents updates on local events as well as other developments throughout the region. Also, the program has in-depth interviews with the local Mayor & Council and City Staff, special events coverage, and how-to videos.

These monthly news reports vary in topic every month. For instance, the March 2015 video describes the new City Hall, education and National Parks news.

Government and infrastructure
The Florida Department of Corrections operates the Dade Correctional Institution and the Homestead Correctional Institution in an unincorporated area near Homestead. The Dade CI was originally the Dade Correctional Institution Annex, and the Homestead CI was originally the Dade Correctional Institution; the two received their current names on July 1, 2003. In June 2018, Homestead Temporary Shelter for Unaccompanied Children, a federal facility operated by Comprehensive Health Services, Inc., was estimated to hold 1,000 minor detainees.

The United States Postal Service operates the Homestead Post Office.

The Homestead Police Department located at 45 Northwest First Avenue in Homestead.

On October 11, 1957, an Air Force B-47 Stratojet carrying a nuclear bomb crashed on takeoff at Homestead Air Force Base, present-day Homestead Air Reserve Base.

Transportation

The principal roadways linking Homestead with the rest of Miami-Dade County are US 1, the Florida Turnpike and State Road 997. The Florida Turnpike has three exits (6, 5 and 2) as it runs south through eastern Homestead before eventually terminating at US 1 in Florida City. US 1 (Homestead Blvd.) runs northeast-to-southwest roughly through the middle of the city, and is the only way to continue to the Florida Keys. State Road 997 (Krome Ave.) runs north-south through the western end of Homestead and through the historic downtown district.

Miami-Dade Transit (MDT) runs several Metrobus routes connecting the Homestead/Florida City area to the rest of Miami-Dade County. Express routes run along the South Miami-Dade Busway, connecting the area with Metrorail and the rest of the Metrobus network and on to Tri-Rail, Amtrak and Miami International Airport. In addition, MDT operates Dade-Monroe Express service from Florida City to the Upper Keys.

The City of Homestead operates two local circulator Homestead Trolley lines. This free service operates daily and transits principal residential, business and commercial areas, as well as the historic downtown district and Miami-Dade College's Homestead Campus. The Trolley connects with Metrobus at the Busway and other Metrobus stops throughout the city.

Starting in 2014 the Homestead Trolley began seasonal service to Everglades National Park and Biscayne National Park.  The free Homestead National Parks Trolley is offered by the City of Homestead in partnership with the National Park Service. Operating on weekends between January and April, the service is the only public transportation option available to these two parks.

The Homestead General Aviation Airport is located just northwest of the city's central business district.

There are public marinas at Homestead Bayfront Park and Marina, on Biscayne Bay east of the city and adjacent to Biscayne National Park's Convoy Point Visitor Center, and at Black Point Park and Marina to the northeast.  Convoy Point also has a limited number of marina slips for day visitors to dock.

Most major national car and truck rental companies have rental locations in Homestead or its immediate surroundings.

Points of interest

 ArtSouth Artist's Community at Homestead, Florida
 Biscayne National Park
 Coral Castle
 Everglades Alligator Farm
 Everglades National Park
 Showbiz Cinemas
 Fruit and Spice Park
 Homestead Bayfront Park and Marina
 Homestead General Aviation Airport
 Homestead Historic Downtown District
 Homestead Seaboard Air Line Railway Station
 Homestead Hospital Baptist Health South Florida
 Homestead Pavilion
 Homestead Championship Rodeo
 Homestead-Miami Speedway
 Homestead Sports Complex
 Homestead Air Reserve Base 
 Knaus Berry Farm
 Monkey Jungle
 Robert Is Here Fruit Stand and Farm
 Schnebly Redland's Winery
 Seminole Theatre
 South Dade Rail Trail
 Turkey Point Nuclear Generating Station

Notable people
 John Brown, NFL wide receiver for the Buffalo Bills
 Alan Campbell, actor
 Tracy Grammer, singer-songwriter
 Dexter Lehtinen, former United States Attorney for the Southern District of Florida
 Scott Maddox, former mayor of Tallahassee, Florida
 Alek Manoah, baseball player for the Toronto Blue Jays, 2019 MLB Draft #11 overall selection
 Chrissy Metz, actress and singer
 Antrel Rolle, former NFL defensive line backer for the New York Giants
 Lacey Sturm, former lead vocalist of rock band Flyleaf
 Tommy Tate, soul singer and songwriter
 Tom Vasel, podcaster, board game reviewer, and board game designer
 Brent Venables, University of Oklahoma head football coach
 Herb Waters, NFL cornerback for the Green Bay Packers
 Jeff Zucker, former president of CNN Worldwide, former president of NBC Universal

Education

Public schools

Homestead is within the Miami-Dade County Public Schools district.

Homestead and the region are zoned to the following elementary, middle and K–8 center schools:
 Air Base K–8 Center
 Avocado Elementary School
 Campbell Drive K–8 Center
 Campbell Drive Middle School
 Coconut Palm K–8 Academy
 Gateway Environmental K–8 Learning Center
 It opened with grades Kindergarten through 4 in 2009, making it the first district-operated public school established in Homestead in a period of more than 30 years. It would add an additional grade level per year until it had 8th grade. Its cafeteria is named Croc Café after its mascot, the crocodile. Each class does a different science project each year.
 Homestead Middle School
 Irving & Beatrice Peskoe K–8 Center
 Laura C. Saunders Elementary School
 Leisure City K–8 Center
 Mandarin Lakes K–8 Academy
 Miami MacArthur South
 Neva King Cooper Education
 Redland Elementary School
 Redland Middle School
 Redondo Elementary School
 School for Advanced Studies-Homestead
 South Dade Middle School (Grades 4–8)
 West Homestead Elementary School
 William A. Chapman Elementary School
 MAST (Medical Academy for Science and Technology) @ Homestead
 Somerset Academy South Homestead Middle - High
 Somerset City Arts Conservatory 

Most of Homestead is zoned to Homestead High School, while a northwest portion is zoned to South Dade High School, located outside the city limits in unincorporated Miami-Dade County.

Homestead is zoned to South Dade Educational Center.

Charter schools

Homestead also has the following charter schools:
 Keys Gate Charter School
 Waterstone Charter School
 Advantage Academy of Math and Science at Waterstone
 Everglades Preparatory Academy
 ASPIRA South Youth Leadership Charter School
 Mavericks High of South Miami Dade County
 Somerset City Arts Conservatory
 Somerset Academy Charter Elementary School (South Homestead)
 Somerset Academy (Silver Palms)
 Somerset Oaks Academy
 Summerville Advantage Academy
 School for Integrated Academics and Technologies (SIATech)
 Miami Arts Charter School

Private schools

The Roman Catholic Archdiocese of Miami previously operated Sacred Heart School in Homestead. It closed in 2009.

Colleges and universities

Homestead is also home to Miami-Dade College Homestead Campus.

Parks and recreation

 Angelo Mistretta Park
 Audubon Park
 Biscado Park
 Blakey Park
 Camp Owaissa Bauer
 Ernestine Jackson Seymore Park
 Harris Field Park
 Homestead Air Reserve Park
 James Archer Smith Park
 JD Redd Park
 Leisure Park
 Leisure Lakes Park
 Losner Park
 Mayor Roscoe Warren Municipal Park
 Modello Wayside Park
 Musselwhite Park
 Naranja Lakes Park
 Palmland Park
 Phicol Williams Community Center
 Roby George Park
 Royal Colonial Park
 Seminole Wayside Park
 South Dade Park
 William F. Dickinson Community Center
 Wittkop Park

References

Surrounding areas

  Unincorporated Miami-Dade County, Leisure City, Homestead Base
  Unincorporated Miami-Dade County    Homestead Base
 Unincorporated Miami-Dade County, Florida City   Homestead Base, Unincorporated Miami-Dade County
  Florida City    Unincorporated Miami-Dade County
  Florida City, Unincorporated Miami-Dade County

External links

 Official website
 Homestead/Florida City Chamber of Commerce

 
Cities in Miami-Dade County, Florida
Cities in Florida
Cities in Miami metropolitan area
1913 establishments in Florida
Populated places established in 1913